Vittoria Crispo (1 May 1900 – 24 December 1973) was an Italian film and television actress.

Filmography

References

Bibliography
 Ennio Bìspuri. Totò: principe clown : tutti i film di Totò. Guida Editori, 1997.

External links

1900 births
1973 deaths
Italian film actresses
Italian television actresses
Actresses from Naples